St. John the Evangelist Anglican Church is an Anglican church in downtown Peterborough, Ontario. It is considered one of the earliest stone Anglican churches of Gothic design in Canada. It is recognized for its heritage value by the City of Peterborough Bylaw 1977–78.

History
St. John the Evangelist Anglican Church was founded in 1826 as a mission church of the Diocese of Quebec by the newly ordained deacon Samuel Armour who began services in the local schoolhouse. The cornerstone for the present building was laid in 1835 and regular services began in February 1837. The church built from locally quarried stone was designed by William Coverdale in the Gothic Revival style. Coverdale's design was adapted from John W. Howard's design for a small church. In 1878, a parish hall was added to the west of the building. A major renovation in 1882 added the sacristy and chancel wing. Other architects who have overseen later alterations and additions include Kivas Tully, John E. Belcher, William Blackwell and Craig, Zeidler and Strong.

The 14 bells in the church's tower are known as "People's Chime" and were dedicated on June 22, 1911.

External links

References

Churches in Peterborough, Ontario
Anglican church buildings in Ontario
19th-century Anglican church buildings in Canada
Gothic Revival church buildings in Canada
Churches completed in 1837
Designated heritage properties in Ontario